KCWF may refer to:

 Chennault International Airport (ICAO code KCWF)
 KCWF-LP, a low-power television station (channel 20) licensed to Las Cruces, New Mexico, United States